Bruce Robert Cordell (born 1968) is an American author of roleplaying games and fantasy novels. He has worked on Dungeons & Dragons games for Wizards of the Coast. He won the Origins Award for Return to the Tomb of Horrors and has also won several ENnies. He lives in Seattle.

Early life and education
Bruce Cordell played Dungeons & Dragons as a youth, and even recalled playing the original Tomb of Horrors adventure with future fellow game designer Monte Cook when they were in high school together. Cordell was a wrestler and a debater, and also earned a degree in biology from the University of Colorado. Cordell once worked in the biopharmaceutical industry, where he learned to synthesize DNA.

Roleplaying work
Cordell worked on freelance game design while working in the scientific field, and was eventually hired as a full-time game designer by TSR in 1995. Cordell created the Far Realm for the adventure The Gates of Firestorm Peak (1996). He authored the Sea Devils Adventure Trilogy, The Illithiad, the Shattered Circle, Bastion of Faith, the Dungeon Builder's Guidebook, and the adventures Die Vecna Die!, Return to the Tomb of Horrors, and Return to White Plume Mountain for the AD&D game, as well as the Tangents sourcebook and The Killing Jar adventure for the Alternity game. Cordell and Steve Miller worked on Die Vecna Die! (2000) together, an original adventure that brought an end to the Advanced Dungeons & Dragons line. Cordell was also one of the designers working on the first new adventures for the 3rd Edition Dungeons & Dragons game, beginning with The Sunless Citadel. Cordell and Rich Baker wrote a new version of the Gamma World Roleplaying Game (2010), which was based on the fourth edition D&D rules.

He won the Origins Award for Return to the Tomb of Horrors, and ENnies for Mindscapes, If Thoughts Could Kill, and his work on the Manual of the Planes. Bruce wrote the novels Oath of Nerull, Lady of Poison, Darkvision, Stardeep, and the Abolethic Sovereignty trilogy. Short stories he's written have appeared in various anthologies, including "Black Arrow" in Realms of War.

Bruce Cordell's RPG work includes many scenarios and sourcebooks; many of which are directly or indirectly concerned with monsters of a Lovecraftian bent (particularly mind flayers and psionics).

Cordell frequently references certain characters, ideas, and organizations in his RPG works, creating a private continuity between various supplements. For example, The Illithiad references the character of Strom Wakeman and the organization known as the Arcane Order (an organization detailed heavily in another of Cordell's works, College of Wizardry). Wakeman was quoted occasionally in Planescape books by Cordell, such as A Guide to the Ethereal Plane, and was instrumental to the course of events in the adventure Dawn of the Overmind (books which were themselves also connected through a phenomenon called an ether gap). Meanwhile, the Arcane Order returned in Tome and Blood as a detailed organization and the basis of a prestige class.

Most of Cordell's work for Malhavoc Press has followed similar patterns, creating a sort of story arc across When the Sky Falls, If Thoughts Could Kill, and Hyperconscious, connected by the god-like Dark Plea and, to a lesser extent, the kureshim race. In an interview with Monte Cook, Cordell himself described his style as including "subtle story threads that connect seemingly unrelated projects".

Cordell co-designed the 4th Edition Forgotten Realms Campaign Guide, and Gamma World Seventh Edition.

After working for a few years as a designer on the fifth edition of D&D, Cordell left Wizards in July 2013. In August of the same year he joined Monte Cook at Cook's company Monte Cook Games, LLC (also called MCG) as Senior Designer. Not long after, MCG Kickstarted another RPG, The Strange. The Strange, co-written by Cordell and Cook, was published in August 2014.

Novels
Myth of the Maker (a novel of The Strange), April 2017
Spinner of Lies (Forgotten Realms Novel, #2 in series Sword of the Gods), June 2012
Sword of the Gods (Forgotten Realms Novel, #1 in series Sword of the Gods/Abyssal Plague tie-in novel), April 2011
Key of Stars (Forgotten Realms Novel, #3 in series Abolethic Sovereignty), September 2010
City of Torment (Forgotten Realms Novel, #2 in series Abolethic Sovereignty), September 2009
Plague of Spells (Forgotten Realms Novel, #1 in series Abolethic Sovereignty), December 2008
Stardeep (Forgotten Realms Novel, #3 in series The Dungeons), November 2007
Darkvision (Forgotten Realms Novel, #3 in series The Wizards), 2006
Lady of Poison (Forgotten Realms Novel, #1 in series The Priests), 2005
Oath of Nerull (Writing as T. H. Lain), 2004

Short stories
"Wandering Stones", Realms of the Dead, Forgotten Realms Anthology, January 2010
"Black Arrow", Realms of War, Forgotten Realms Compilation, March 2008
"Not all that Tempts", Dragon's Return, Malhavoc Press, 2005
"Hollows of the Heart", Children of the Rune, Malhavoc Press, 2004

Role-playing games

Adventures

2nd Edition AD&D
 The Gates of Firestorm Peak (1996)
 Evil Tide (1997)
 Night of the Shark (1997)
 Sea of Blood (1997)
 Return to the Tomb of Horrors (1998)
 A Darkness Gathering (1998)
 Masters of Eternal Night (1998)
 Dawn of the Overmind (1998)
 The Shattered Circle (1998)
 Return to White Plume Mountain (1999)
 Die Vecna Die! (with Steve Miller, 2000)
 Reverse Dungeon (with John D. Rateliff, 2000)

3rd Edition D&D
 The Sunless Citadel (2000)
 Heart of Nightfang Spire (2001)
 Bastion of Broken Souls (2002)
 Grasp of the Emerald Claw (2005)

4th Edition D&D
 Keep on the Shadowfell (2008)
 Assault on Nightwyrm Fortress (2009)
 Death's Reach (2009)
 Kingdom of the Ghouls (2009)

Cypher System
 The Strange (2014)
 The Strange: The Dark Spiral (2014)
 The Strange: Eschatology Code (2014)
 Encyclopedia of Impossible Things (2016)
 Gods of the Fall (2016)

Sourcebooks

2nd Edition AD&D
 College of Wizardry (1998)
 Dungeon Builder's Guidebook (1998)
 Bastion of Faith (1999)
 The Illithiad (1998)

3rd Edition D&D
 Enemies and Allies (2001)
 Psionics Handbook (2001)
 Epic Level Handbook
 Tome and Blood (2001)
 Underdark (2003)
 Expanded Psionics Handbook (2004)
 Complete Psionics (2006)

Third-Party d20 System Sourcebooks
 If Thoughts Could Kill (Malhavoc Press, 2002)
 Hyperconscious (Malhavoc Press, 2004)

4th Edition D&D 

 Forgotten Realms Campaign Guide (2008)
 Draconomicon I: Chromatic Dragons (2008)
 Open Grave: Secrets of the Undead (2009)

5th Edition D&D

Player's Handbook  (2014)
Dungeon Master's Guide (2014)
Monster Manual (2014)

Cypher System
 The Strange (2014)
 The Strange Players Guide (2014)
 Numenera: The Ninth World Bestiary (2014)
 The Strange Bestiary (2014)
Jade Colossus: Ruins of the Prior Worlds (2017)
Numenera 2: Discovery & Destiny (2018)

Media mentions
Bruce Cordell has appeared in the following newspaper and magazine articles, websites and podcasts.

Podcasts
 RPG Countdown: Bruce appeared on these episodes: 28 January 2009 (Open Grave: Secrets of the Undead), 25 March 2009 (Assault on Nightwyrm Fortress).

References

External links
 Bruce Cordell's web site and blog
 The Simple (Yet Epic) Elegance of Bruce R. Cordell
 
 Interview with Bruce Cordell
 

1968 births
21st-century American male writers
21st-century American novelists
American fantasy writers
American male novelists
American science fiction writers
Dungeons & Dragons game designers
Living people